The 1924 Georgia Tech Golden Tornado football team represented the Georgia Tech Golden Tornado of the Georgia Institute of Technology during the 1924 Southern Conference football season. The Tornado was coached by William Alexander in his fifth year as head coach, compiling a record of 5–3–1 record.

The Tornado defeated eastern power Penn State, and suffered losses to SoCon champion Alabama, national champion Notre Dame, and Vanderbilt, which defeated Tech in Atlanta for the first time since 1906.

Doug Wycoff was All-American.

Schedule

Season summary

Oglethorpe
The season opened with a 19–0 defeat of the Southern Intercollegiate Athletic Association co-champion Oglethorpe Stormy Petrels.

VMI

Tech edged VMI with an Ike Williams field goal.
 
The starting lineup was Merkle (left end), Usry (left tackle), Godwin (left guard), Poole (center), Carpenter (right guard), Gardner (right tackle), Nebelle (right end), Wilton (quarterback), Williams (left halfback), Reeves (right halfback), Wycoff (fullback).
https://en.wikipedia.org/w/index.php?title=1924_Georgia_Tech_Golden_Tornado_football_team&action=edit&section=4

Florida

Tech and the Florida Gators fought to a 7–7 tie, the second Florida-Tech tie in two years.

Within the first few minutes, Tech scored when Gus Merkle launched at Edgar C. Jones, causing him to crash into the approaching  Cy Williams and fumble. Doug Wycoff picked it up and ran 35 yards for the score. Florida once fumbled at Tech's 1-yard line. Again the Gators drove to the goal, and a Jones to Ark Newton pass tied the game.

The starting lineup was Merkle (left end), Usry (left tackle), Godwin (left guard), Poole (center), Carpenter (right guard), Gardner (right tackle), Nebelle (right end), Wilton (quarterback), Williams (left halfback), Connelly (right halfback), Wycoff (fullback).

Penn State

Sources:

Tech upset the Penn State Nittany Lions 15–13.  Ike William made two field goals, one in the first and the other in the third quarter. In the second quarter, Tech's Gardner picked up a fumble by Penn State's quarterback Baker, and raced 20 yards for a touchdown. and a safety made Tech's 15. Soon after, Tech gots its safety. In the final period, State staged a desperate comeback and scored two touchdowns.

The starting lineup was Merkle (left end), Usry (left tackle), Godwin (left guard), Glenn (center), Carpenter (right guard), Gardner (right tackle), Nebelle (right end), Moore (quarterback), Williams (left halfback), Reeves (right halfback), Wycoff (fullback).

Alabama

Sources:

Coach Wallace Wade's Alabama Crimson Tide defeated Tech 14–0, handing coach Alexander his first loss to a Southern team. Tech drove the ball to the Alabama 6 in the third with a chance to tie the game up but was stopped on 4th and 1.

The starting lineup was Marshall (left end), Usry (left tackle), Godwin (left guard), Poole (center), Carpenter (right guard), Tharpe (right tackle), Nabelle (right end), Moore (quarterback), Williams (left halfback), Reeves (right halfback), Wycoff (fullback).

Notre Dame
Tech lost to Knute Rockne's national champion Notre Dame Fighting Irish with the Four Horsemen 34–3. The starting lineup was Nabelle (left end), Gardner (left tackle), Carpenter (left guard), Poole (center), Godwin (right guard), Usry (right tackle), Marshall (right end), Wilton (quarterback), Williams (left halfback), Connelly (right halfback), Wycoff (fullback).

LSU
Tech beat coach Mike Donahue's LSU Tigers 28–7. The starting lineup was King (left end), Usry (left tackle), Godwin (left guard), Poole (center), Forrester (right guard), Huffkines (right tackle), Gardner (right end), Wilton (quarterback), Williams (left halfback), Murray (right halfback), Wycoff (fullback).

Vanderbilt

Sources:

The Vanderbilt Commodores traveled to Atlanta followed by the largest crowd ever to accompany Vanderbilt on a trip, with five special sections. The lone score of the game could largely be credited to halfback Gil Reese. Vanderbilt elected to start the game with the wind at its back, hoping for an edge in punts which would lead to good field position early. Reese caught one of these punts in these exchanges on the fly and, noticing both of Tech's ends blocked to the ground, raced to within striking distance of the end zone. From there, Hek Wakefield made a drop kick. Wakefield was the star of the game; "He was death on returning punts and when he started around the ends the Tech stars groaned," recalls one account.

Georgia Tech's one chance to score came when fullback Douglas Wycoff missed a kick low, partially blocked by Vanderbilt. Hendrix attempted to recover but missed, and Georgia Tech retained possession at the 4-yard line. On first down, a snap from center missed Wycoff, and Vanderbilt fullback Tom Ryan recovered the ball at the 15-yard line, and later punted it away to safety. The game was a defensive scrap the rest of the way.

Gil Reese gained −15 yards rushing, and Wycoff was stopped all game. Bip Farnsworth was the Tornado's lone consistent ground gainer. The punting battle between Douglas Wycoff and Tom Ryan was one of the few noted features of the game.

The starting lineup was King (left end), Usry (left tackle), Godwin (left guard), Poole (center), Carpenter (right guard), Gardner (right tackle), Nabelle (right end), Wilton (quarterback), Williams (left halfback), Murray (right halfback), Wycoff (fullback).

Auburn

Sources:

Tech beat rival Auburn 7–0. On the first play of the fourth quarter, Wycoff extended the ball over the goal line.

The starting lineup was King (left end), Usry (left tackle), Godwin (left guard), Poole (center), Carpenter (right guard), Gardner (right tackle), Nabelle (right end), S. Murray (quarterback), I. Williams (left halfback), Farnsworh (right halfback), Wycoff (fullback).

Postseason
Doug Wycoff was selected first-team All-American by Lawrence Perry.

Personnel

Depth chart
The following chart provides a visual depiction of Tech's lineup during the 1924 season with games started at the position reflected in parenthesis. The chart mimics the offense after the jump shift has taken place.

Notes

Endnotes

References
 
 

Georgia Tech
Georgia Tech Yellow Jackets football seasons
Georgia Tech Golden Tornado football
1920s in Atlanta